Cut is the second studio album by C-Tec, released on 15 February 2000 by Synthetic Symphony. The album was ranked #25 on the German Alternative Charts (DAC) Top 50 Albums of 2000. On 5 October 2018 the album was reissued as a music download with an additional track titled "Until We Disappear" and written by Marc Heal.

Reception 
Niklas Forsberg of Release Magazine awarded the album six out of ten, describing the music as "almost exclusively overdone in the sense that the aggressiveness became too dominant" and saying "the one thing making me give "Cut" a grade above average is due to the participation of veteran, almost cult declared artist Jean-Luc De Meyer." Regen said "In many ways, Cut is an improvement on Darker – the production is cleaner and has a more modern sheen" and "the palette of sound is more consistent, making it a more cohesive album." The critic went on to claim "it also feels like it plays it, if not safe, at least safer, leaning more toward traditional industrial sounds and beats... but a really solid version of those sounds."

Track listing

Personnel 
Adapted from the Cut liner notes.

C-Tec
 Jean-Luc de Meyer – vocals
 Ged Denton – synthesizer
 Marc Heal – synthesizer, additional vocals, production

'Additional performers
 Julian Beeston – drums, additional synthesizer
 David Bianchi – guitar
 Doug Martin – synthesizer, additional guitar, engineering

Production and design
 Peter Anderson – photography
 Patrick Bird – mastering
 Greg Jakobek – design
 Jim Marcus – cover art (reissue)
 Jules Seifert – remastering (reissue)

Release history

References

External links 
 
 Cut at Bandcamp
 Cut at iTunes

2000 albums
Synthetic Symphony albums
C-Tec albums